The 1864 New Hampshire gubernatorial election was held on March 8, 1864.

Incumbent Republican Governor Joseph A. Gilmore defeated Democratic nominee Edward W. Harrington with 54.08% of the vote.

General election

Candidates
Joseph A. Gilmore, Republican, incumbent Governor
Edward W. Harrington, Democratic, former mayor of Manchester

Results

Notes

References

1864
New Hampshire
Gubernatorial